is a virtual board game for the Nintendo 64 based on Jinsei Game, a Japanese counterpart to The Game of Life. It was released only in Japan in 1999.

References

Digital board games
Nintendo 64 games
Nintendo 64-only games
1999 video games
Japan-exclusive video games
Video games developed in Japan